Kosinova is a rural locality in Nikolsky Selsoviet Rural Settlement, Oktyabrsky District, Kursk Oblast, Russia. Population:

Geography 
The village is located on the Rogozna River (a right tributary of the Seym River), 78 km from the Russia–Ukraine border, 29 km north-west of Kursk, 22 km north-west of the district center – the urban-type settlement Pryamitsyno, at the еаstern border of the selsoviet center – Stoyanova.

 Climate
Kosinova has a warm-summer humid continental climate (Dfb in the Köppen climate classification).

Transport 

The rural locality is situated 38.5 km from Kursk Vostochny Airport, 142 km from Belgorod International Airport and 241 km from Voronezh Peter the Great Airport.

References

Notes

Sources

Rural localities in Oktyabrsky District, Kursk Oblast